Dendrocousinsia is a plant genus of the family Euphorbiaceae first described as a genus in 1913. The entire genus is endemic to the Island of Jamaica.

Species
 Dendrocousinsia alpina Fawc. & Rendle 1919 - E Jamaica
 Dendrocousinsia fasciculata Millsp. 1913 - NW Jamaica
 Dendrocousinsia spicata Millsp. 1913 - SC Jamaica

References

Hippomaneae
Flora of Jamaica
Euphorbiaceae genera